Toshiyuki is a masculine Japanese given name.

Possible writings
Toshiyuki can be written using different combinations of kanji characters. Here are some examples:

敏幸, "agile, happiness"
敏行, "agile, go"
敏之, "agile, of"
敏志, "agile, determination"
敏恭, "agile, respectful"
俊幸, "talented, happiness"
俊行, "talented, go"
俊之, "talented, of"
俊志, "talented, determination"
俊恭, "talented, respectful"
利幸, "benefit, happiness"
利行, "benefit, go"
利之, "benefit, of"
寿幸, "long life, happiness"
寿行, "long life, go"
寿之, "long life, of"
年幸, "year, happiness"
年行, "year, go"
年之, "year, of"

The name can also be written in hiragana としゆき or katakana トシユキ.

Notable people with the name
, Japanese footballer.
, Japanese Go player.
, Japanese composer.
Toshiyuki Fujiwara (藤原 敏行, birthdate unknown – 901 or 907), Japanese poet and nobleman.
, Japanese rugby union player.
Toshiyuki Igarashi (五十嵐 俊幸, born 1984), Japanese boxer.
, Japanese writer.
, Japanese politician.
Toshiyuki Kita (喜多 俊之, born 1942), Japanese furniture and product designer.
Toshiyuki Kubooka (窪岡 俊之, born 1963), Japanese animator, character designer and illustrator.
Toshiyuki Kuroiwa (黒岩 敏幸, born 1969), Japanese former speed skater.
, Japanese water polo player.
Toshiyuki Morikawa (森川 智之, born 1967), Japanese voice actor.
Toshiyuki Moriuchi (森内 俊之, born 1970), Japanese shogi player.
Toshiyuki Nakao (中尾 敏之, born 1974), Japanese shogi player.
Toshiyuki Nishida (西田 敏行, born 1947), Japanese actor.
, Japanese weightlifter.
, Japanese ice hockey player.
Toshiyuki Sakata (坂田 敏行, 1920–1982), aka "Harold Sakata", Japanese wrestler and actor.
Toshiyuki Shimada (島田 俊行, born 1951), Japanese-American orchestral conductor.
Toshiyuki Takahashi (高橋 利幸, born 1959), former executive of Hudson Soft.
Toshiyuki Takano (高野 紀元, born 1944), Japanese ambassador to Germany.
, Japanese equestrian.
Toshiyuki Tanaka (田中 稔之, 1928–2006), Japanese artist.
Toshiyuki Toyonaga (豊永 利行, born 1984), Japanese voice actor.
Toshiyuki Uno (マイケル・トシユキ・ウノ, born 1950), Japanese-American film and television director.
Toshiyuki Watanabe (渡辺 俊幸, born 1955), Japanese musician and composer.

Fictional characters
Toshiyuki Aoshima (青島 俊之), from Oh! My Goddess.
Toshiyuki Kohda (コウダ・トシユキ), from Ultraman Saga.
Toshiyuki Roberi (炉縁 俊幸), from Prefectural Earth Defense Force.
Toshiyuki Saejima (冴島 俊行), from Great Teacher Onizuka.

Japanese masculine given names